The warty thick-toed gecko (Elasmodactylus tuberculosus) is a species of lizard in the family Gekkonidae. It is found in eastern Africa .

References

Elasmodactylus
Reptiles of the Democratic Republic of the Congo
Reptiles of Tanzania
Reptiles of Zambia
Reptiles of Zimbabwe
Taxa named by George Albert Boulenger
Reptiles described in 1895